Tobias Clemens (born 14 August 1979) is a former German professional tennis player, who played mainly on the ATP Challenger Tour and ITF Futures tournaments. 

His best result was at ATP Metz 2006 where he reached the quarter-finals as a qualifier and lost to future world number one tennis player Novak Djokovic 4–6, 1–6.

References
 Djokovic, Frenchmen Into Metz Semis

External links
 
 

  
German male tennis players
Sportspeople from Bonn
1979 births
Living people
Tennis people from North Rhine-Westphalia